Dignitas may refer to:

Dignitas (Roman concept), a Roman virtue
Dignitas (assisted dying organisation) 
Dignitas International, a humanitarian organisation
Dignitas (esports), a US-based esports team
Dignitas Personae, a Vatican instruction on bioethics
 Dignitas (journal), academic journal from Slovenia

See also
Dignity (disambiguation)